Tyler Moy (born July 18, 1995) is a Swiss-American professional ice hockey forward who currently plays for the SC Rapperswil-Jona Lakers of the National League (NL). He previously played with Lausanne HC, Genève-Servette HC and within the Nashville Predators organization of the National Hockey League (NHL). Moy was drafted 175th overall by the Predators in the 2015 NHL Entry Draft.

Playing career
Moy played college hockey while studying at Harvard University. He was drafted 175th overall by the Nashville Predators in the 2015 NHL Entry Draft. 

On April 10, 2017, Moy was signed to a two-year entry-level contract by the Nashville Predators. He only played a full season within the organization in 2017/18, appearing in 72 games and putting up 16 points (6 goals) with their American Hockey League (AHL) affiliate, the Milwaukee Admirals.

On November 5, 2018, Moy was signed to a one-year contract by Lausanne HC of the National League (NL). On December 22, 2018, Moy was signed to an early two-year contract extension by Lausanne HC through to the end of the 2020/21 season.

On August 23, 2020, Moy was traded to Genève-Servette HC in exchange for Floran Douay and Guillaume Maillard.

On April 6, 2021, Moy agreed to an early two-year contract extension with Servette through the 2022/23 season.

Personal life
Moy holds both Swiss and American citizenship.

References

External links

1995 births
Living people
American people of French descent
American people of Breton descent
American men's ice hockey forwards
Atlanta Gladiators players
Ice hockey players from California
Genève-Servette HC players
Harvard Crimson men's ice hockey players
Lausanne HC players
Milwaukee Admirals players
Nashville Predators draft picks
SC Rapperswil-Jona Lakers players
Swiss ice hockey forwards